Jessica Naz (born 24 September 2000) is an English footballer who plays as a forward for Women's Super League club Tottenham Hotspur.

Club career
Naz came up through the Tottenham Hotspur academy, but made her senior debut for Arsenal on 23 February 2018, coming on as a  substitute for Heather O'Reilly for the last three minutes of Arsenal's 1–0 win over Everton in the 2017–18 season.

Naz rejoined Tottenham later in 2018 and helped Tottenham achieve promotion FA Women's Super League, although she missed the 2019–20 season due to an anterior cruciate ligament injury. She returned from injury in December 2020 and in February 2021, she signed a contract extension through June 2022 with an option for an additional year.

Career statistics

Club

References

External links

Profile at Tottenham Hotspur F.C.

2000 births
Living people
English women's footballers
Black British sportswomen
Women's Super League players
Arsenal W.F.C. players
FA Women's National League players
Women's association football forwards
Tottenham Hotspur F.C. Women players
Footballers from Greater London